The 2016 Constellation Cup was the 7th Constellation Cup series played between Australia and New Zealand. The series, also known as the New World Netball Series, featured four netball test matches, played in October 2016. The Australia team was coached by Lisa Alexander and captained by Clare McMeniman. New Zealand were coached by Janine Southby and captained by Katrina Grant. Australia won the first test before New Zealand leveled the series with a win in the second test. Australia won the third and fourth tests to secure the series 3–1.

Squads

Australia

New Zealand

 
Debuts
 Gina Crampton made her senior debut for New Zealand in the first test on 9 October 2016.

Umpires

Matches

New World Netball Series

First test

Second test

Third test

Fourth test

References

2016
2016 in New Zealand netball
2016 in Australian netball
October 2016 sports events in New Zealand
October 2016 sports events in Australia